Mandalay Region (formerly Mandalay Division) is an administrative division of Myanmar. It is located in the center of the country, bordering Sagaing Region and Magway Region to the west, Shan State to the east, and Bago Region and Kayin State to the south. The regional capital is Mandalay. To the south of the region lies the national capital of Naypyidaw. The division consists of eleven districts, which are subdivided into 28 townships and 2,320 wards and village-tracts.

Mandalay Region is important in Myanmar's economy, accounting for 15% of the national economy. It is under the administration of the Mandalay Region Government.

History
The history of Mandalay Region is the same as that of much of Upper Myanmar except that for much of Burmese history, the political power emanated out of royal capitals located in Mandalay Region. The country's present capital, Naypyidaw, and most former royal capitals of the Burmese nation—Bagan, Ava, Amarapura, Mandalay—are all located here.

The Tibeto-Burman speaking Pyu were the first historical people to dominate the dry zone in central Myanmar that includes Mandalay Region as early as the 1st century AD. By the early 9th century, the Pyu were decimated in a series of wars with the Nanzhao kingdom from Yunnan. The Burmans, who had been migrating into the region from Yunnan in the 9th century, founded a city of their own, Pagan, in 849. The Pagan dynasty gradually came to dominate the central zone over the next two centuries, and by the late 11th century, all of present-day Myanmar. The Burmese language and script came to prominence with royal patronage of Pagan kings.

After the fall of Pagan to the Mongols in 1287, parts of central Myanmar came to be controlled by a series of rulers: the Mongols (1287-c.1303), Myinsaing (1298–1313), Pinya (1313–1364), and Sagaing (1315–1364). In 1364, Ava kingdom led by Burmanized Shan kings reunified all of central Myanmar. Central Myanmar was under Ava's control until 1527, and under the Shans of Monhyin (1527–1555). Burmese literature and culture came into its own during this era. Central Myanmar was part of the Taungoo kingdom from 1555 to 1752. Parts of the region fell briefly to the Mons of Pegu (Bago) (1752–1753). Konbaung dynasty ruled the region until December 1885 when it lost all of Upper Myanmar in the Third Anglo-Burmese War.

The British administration organized seven divisions in Upper Myanmar: Mandalay, Meiktila, Minbu, Sagaing, and the Federated Shan States (North and South). Mandalay Division included what is now Kachin State. Circa 1940, Meiktila Division was merged with Mandalay Division. Much of Upper Myanmar, including Mandalay Division, was under the Japanese rule during World War II between May 1942 and March 1945. When the country gained independence from the United Kingdom in January 1948, the Myikyina and Bhamo districts were carved out to form Kachin State.

Administrative divisions
Before 2010, Mandalay Region consists of 8 districts. Later the Pyinmana district was formed as Union Territory under the direct administration of president. So Mandalay Region remains 28 townships organized into eleven districts.

Districts

Townships

Towns

Mandalay
Amarapura
Pyinoolwin
Thabeikkyin
Tada-U
Kyaukse
Myingyan
Meiktila
Nyaung-U
Yamethin
Patheingyi
Madaya
Mogok
Singu
Ngazun
Myittha
Sintgaing
Natogyi
Taungtha
Thazi
Wundwin
Mahlaing
Kyaukpadaung
Pyawbwe
Myitnge
Tagaung
Kume
Bagan
Semekon
Ngathayout

Government

Executive

During the ruling of junta, the region peace and development committee is the administrative body of Mandalay Region. In 2011, the new government form was introduced, and the Mandalay Region Government became the main administrative body of the region. The government is led by Chief Minister. The Government Office is located in Aungmyaythazan Township.

Legislature

In 2011, the State and Region Hluttaws were introduced in the new system. Each State and Region has a State Hluttaw or Regional Hluttaw made up of elected civilian members and unelected representatives of the Armed Forces. The number of seats in each State or Region Hluttaw depends on the number of townships (each township constituency has two MPs), as well as ethnic representatives. The Mandalay Region Hluttaw have 57 elected members (include one ethnic affairs minister) and 19 military representatives.

Judiciary
Under the Mandalay Region High Court there are eight district courts, Mandalay, Pyin Oo Lwin, Kyaukse, Meithtila, Myingyan, Nyaung Oo, Yamethin and Dakina (for Union Territory). There are 35 township courts including the townships of Union Territory and 5 special courts.

Demographics

The majority of the population in Mandalay Region are Bamar (Burmans). In the Mandalay metropolitan area, however, a large community of Chinese, most of whom are recent immigrants from Yunnan, now nearly rival the Bamar population. A large community of Indians also reside in Mandalay. A dwindling community of Anglo-Burmese still exists in both Pyinoolwin and Mandalay. A number of Shan people live along the eastern border of the region.

Burmese is the primary language of the division. However, Mandarin Chinese is increasingly spoken in Mandalay and the northern gem mining town of Mogok.

Religion 
According to the 2014 Myanmar census, Buddhists make up 95.7% of Mandalay Region’s population, forming the largest religious community there. Minority religious communities include Christians (1.1%), Muslims (3%), and Hindus (0.2%) who collectively comprise the remainder of Mandalay Region’s population.

According to the State Sangha Maha Nayaka Committee’s 2016 statistics, 99,964 Buddhist monks were registered in Mandalay Region, comprising 18.7% of Myanmar's total Sangha membership, which includes both novice samanera and fully ordained bhikkhu. Mandalay Region is home to Myanmar's largest bhikkhu community. The majority of monks belong to the Thudhamma Nikaya (92.3%), followed by Shwegyin Nikaya (7.1%), with the remainder of monks belonging to other small monastic orders. 8,174 thilashin were registered in Mandalay Region, comprising 13.5% of Myanmar’s total thilashin community.

Economy
Agriculture is the primary economical source of livelihood. Primary crops grown within Mandalay Region are rice, wheat, maize, peanut, sesame, cotton, legumes, tobacco, chili, and vegetables. Industry, including alcoholic breweries, textile factories, sugar mills, and gem mines also exists. Tourism now forms a substantial part of Mandalay Region's economy, as it contains many historical sites including Mandalay, Amarapura, Bagan, Pyin U Lwin, Mount Popa, and Ava. Hardwoods such as teak and thanaka are also harvested.

Education

Educational opportunities in Myanmar are extremely limited outside the main cities of Yangon and Mandalay. According to official statistics, over 1 million students were enrolled in the division's 4,467 primary and secondary schools in 2005. Of the total, the vast majority, about 4,000, were primary schools. Only about 13% of primary school students make it to high school.

The region has some of the best institutions of higher education in Myanmar. As medical, engineering and computer studies are the most sought after in Myanmar, the University of Medicine, Mandalay, the University of Dental Medicine, Mandalay, Mandalay Technological University, and the University of Computer Studies, Mandalay are among the most selective universities in Myanmar. Other highly selective schools are Myanmar Aerospace Engineering University and military academies in Pyinoolwin: Defence Services Academy and Defence Services Technological Academy.

Health care

The general state of health care in Myanmar is poor. The military government spends between 0.5% to 3% of the country's GDP on health care, consistently ranking among the lowest in the world. Although health care is nominally free, in reality patients have to pay for medicine and treatment even in public clinics and hospitals. Public hospitals lack many of the basic facilities and equipment. The following is a summary of the public health system in the division, in the fiscal year 2002–2003.

In 2005, Mandalay Region's public health care system had slightly over 1,000 doctors and about 2,000 nurses working in 44 hospitals and 44 health clinics. Over 30 of the hospitals had less than 100 beds. Since almost all of large public hospitals and private hospitals, and doctors are located in Mandalay, these low numbers for a division with 7.7 million are actually even worse in the rest of the division, though these figures are believed to have improved by the advent of Naypyidaw as the nation's capital in 2006 although the level of improvement remains unreported. The well-to-do bypass the public health system and go to private clinics in Mandalay or Yangon in order to receive quicker medical attention and high-quality service. The wealthy routinely go abroad (usually Bangkok or Singapore) for treatment.

Gallery

See also

References

External links

 Official website

 
Regions of Myanmar